In music, a step, or conjunct motion, is the difference in pitch between two consecutive notes of a musical scale. In other words, it is the interval between two consecutive scale degrees. Any larger interval is called a skip (also called a leap), or disjunct motion.

In the diatonic scale, a step is either a minor second (sometimes also called half step) or a major second (sometimes also called whole step), with all intervals of a minor third or larger being skips. For example, C to D (major second) is a step, whereas C to E (major third) is a skip.

More generally, a step is a smaller or narrower interval in a musical line, and a skip is a wider or larger interval with the categorization of intervals into steps and skips is determined by the tuning system and the pitch space used.

Melodic motion in which the interval between any two consecutive pitches is no more than a step, or, less strictly, where skips are rare, is called stepwise or conjunct melodic motion, as opposed to skipwise or disjunct melodic motion, characterized by frequent skips.

Half steps
In the major scale or any of its modes, a step will always be a movement of 1 or 2 semitones, and a skip a movement of 3 or more semitones.

In other scales an augmented second—an incomposite step equivalent to 3 semitones—and/or a diminished third—a skip of 2 semitones—may be possible.

Melody

Melody may be characterized by its degree and type of conjunct and disjunct motion. For example, Medieval plainchant melodies are generally characterized by conjunct motion with occasional thirds, fourths, and generally ascending fifths while larger intervals are quite rare though octave leaps may occur between two separate phrases. Renaissance melodies are generally characterized by conjunct motion, with only occasional leaps of more than a fifth and then rarely anything but a sixth or octave. In contrast, melody in the 20th century varied greatly including the diatonic idiom of the 18th century (Classical), the variety of idioms from the 19th century (Romantic), and newer nondiatonic scales in the 20th century. Some of these later idioms included many or predominantly leaps.

See also
Coltrane changes
Giant Steps (composition)
Linear progression
Transposition (music)

References

Intervals (music)
Melody